Oyungezer is a Turkish video game magazine.

History 

Oyungezer was launched by the former editors of the Turkish edition of LeveL. The editors, after spending a month in recluse, announced the launch of the Oyungezer website and subsequently the forums. Issue #1 was released in November 2007 and sold roughly 7,000 copies, which is a record for a first time issue of a gaming magazine.

Sections 

Oyungezer has five distinctive sections separated by content. The first section immediately following the index is the preview section, entitled 360 drc (360 degrees), edited by Furkan Faruk Akıncı. The review section, which was previously divided into three sections: Console, PC and Online (until the October issue where it was blended into a single entity, with Online retaining its autonomy in the form of the log-in section) focuses on the major new releases of the month. Following the review section, a strategy guide edited (and most of the time, prepared) by the Güven brothers picks a game from that month and offers tips and information. The Ekran Dışı (Out of the Screen) segment follows. Unique to gaming magazines worldwide, this part, edited by Damla Pınar Gök, reviews non-gaming entertainment products released recently. Featuring mostly book, album and movie reviews, this segment is also the host of reader mail-ins, editor columns, and famed editor Göktuğ Yüksel's personal N.E.M. page. Ekran Dışı is followed by Organize Sanayi (Organized Industry) and Pixel which focus on hardware and retro gaming respectively.

Special issues 

 Xbox 360 OGZ Special (2012)

 League of Legends OGZ Special (2014) (Sold separately)

 League of Legends OGZ Special 2nd issue (2014) (Sold separately)

Review system 

In Oyungezer, games can be scored between 0.0 and 10.0. The best scores the magazine have awarded are both a 9.9, given to Grand Theft Auto IV by Tuğbek Ölek and The Elder Scrolls V: Skyrim by Umut Yanık in the November 2008 issue. The previous record was held by Crysis with 9.8, which was awarded to LittleBigPlanet in the same issue. The magazine's lowest scores awarded were 1.0, for The Incredible Hulk and a 3.0 for Soldier of Fortune: Payback, both being given by Kaan Alkın, who is known for his high standards and passion for Star Wars.

Other ventures 

Oyungezer's parent company, SETİ Yapım ve Yayıncılık has expanded its operations since the inception of the magazine. A sister magazine to Oyungezer, Free-2-Play was released in 2009, focusing on free-to-play MMORPGs. SETİ Yapım ve Yayıncılık has also undertaken the content management of TTNET Oyun, a digital video game distribution platform created by the leading internet service provider in Turkey, Türk Telekom. SETİ's other projects (all spearheaded by Oyungezer) include The Game, a gaming lobby at the Point Hotel Barbaros in Istanbul, METUTECH-ATOM, a video game development center placed inside the METU and the Electronic Sports League.

Notes

External links 
 Official website

2007 establishments in Turkey
Magazines established in 2007
Video game magazines published in Turkey